Brachyphylla (Caribbean fruit-eating bat) is a genus of leaf-nosed bats in the family Phyllostomidae. Both species live on islands near or in the Caribbean. The genus contains the following species:
 Cuban fruit-eating bat (B. nana)
 Antillean fruit-eating bat (B. cavernarum)

References

Phyllostomidae
Bat genera
Taxa named by John Edward Gray
Taxonomy articles created by Polbot